The Svatantrika-Prasaṅgika distinction is a set of arguments about two different positions of emptiness philosophy which are debated within the Mahayana school of Buddhism. It is most prominently discussed in Tibetan Buddhism where Prāsaṅgika and Svātantrika, are viewed to be different forms of Madhyamaka philosophy.

For Tsongkhapa, the founder of the Gelugpa school and the most outspoken proponent of the distinction, as well as for the Karma Kagyu school, these differences are of major importance. Tsongkhapa not only negates an inherent identity or self-characterizing essence which resides in persons, things, and abstract phenomena; but he also negates the identity of phenomena as they appear to our instinctive, everyday perception. In contrast, according to Tsongkhapa, the Svātantrika negate a "truly existing self," but maintain that things exist conventionally "according to characteristics."

The heart of the distinction according to Tsongkhapa

Prāsaṅgika
For Tsongkhapa, the Svatantrika-Prasaṅgika distinction centers around the role of prasaṅga (consequence) in a formal debate, and the interpretation of the meaning of both "ultimate truth" and "conventional truth." 

The Prāsaṅgika view holds reductio ad absurdum of essentialist viewpoints to be the most valid method of demonstrating emptiness of inherent existence, and that conventional things do not have a naturally occurring conventional identity. Further, the Prāsaṅgika argue that when initially attempting to find the correct object of understanding - which is a mere absence or mere negation of impossible modes of existence - one should not use positivist statements about the nature of reality. Positing an essencelessness rather than merely negating inherent identity creates a subtle linguistic and analytic barrier to finding the correct understanding. This is exemplified in the debate over the use of the terms "devoid of nature itself" in Gelug Mahamudra (non-affirming negation) and "that which has voidness as its nature" in non-Gelug Mahamudra and Dzogchen (an affirming negation).

Tsongkhapa argued that because the Svatantrika conventionally establish things by their own characteristics, they do not arrive at a complete understanding of emptiness. According to Tsongkhapa, not only were their methods different, but also that students using Svatantrika do not achieve the same realization as those using the Prasangika approach. Lama Tsongkhapa states that when he uses the term "advocates of intrinsic existence" he is referring to both "essentialists and the Svatantrikas." Modern scholars like the 14th Dalai Lama disagree, echoing sentiments from classical authorities like Lobsang Chökyi Gyaltsen (4th Panchen Lama) stating that the credible teachers of the various systems of Buddhist philosophy all "arrive at the same intended point" of realization. However, they openly admit that this non-denominational position is very difficult to establish through reason.

Prāsaṅgika Logic

Consequential syllogistic reasoning
According to Tsongkhapa, if both people in a debate or discussion have a valid understanding of emptiness already, then autonomous syllogistic arguments could be quite effective. However, in a circumstance where one or both parties in a debate or discussion do not hold a valid understanding, "the debate [should be] founded on what the parties accept as valid. Hence, it is proper to refute opponents in terms of what they accept." In other words, it is more appropriate to establish a position of emptiness through showing the logical consequences of the incorrect position that the opponent already accepts, than it is to establish emptiness through syllogistic reasoning using premises that the opponent (and perhaps even the proponent) do not fully or deeply understand. Tsongkhapa quoting Chandrakirti, in the Lamrim Chenmo, Volume Three, on the problem of relying on autonomous syllogistic reasoning:
Tsongkhapa argues further that the Prāsaṅgika's use of reductio ad absurdum is syllogistic, because one "refutes the opponent using a subject, a reason, and so forth that are accepted by that opponent." For example, if cause-effect relationships occur because the sprout itself produces the effect of being a sprout (self-arising), then this "would mean that something that already exists is being produced, [and] production would be purposeless and endless [... if] contradictions are assembled in this way, the only result is that the opponents understand them and abandon" wrong tenets.

Non-affirming negation
A prominent and important feature of the  approach is their use of the non-affirming negation. A non-affirming negation is a negation which does not leave something in the place of what has been negated. For instance, when one says that a Buddhist should not drink alcohol, they are not affirming that a Buddhist should, in fact, drink something else. One is merely negating the consumption of alcohol under a particular circumstance.

According to Tsongkhapa, for the  the philosophical position of emptiness is itself a non-affirming negation, since emptiness is a "lack of inherent existence." One is not affirming anything in the place of that absence of inherence. It is not the presence of some other quality. If one were to describe emptiness as the presence of some quality -for example, a "voidness" or a "thusness" - it would linguistically and philosophically contradict the nature of the object which it is attempting to characterize.

Ignorance - Prasaṅgika Object of Negation
Pabongka Rinpoche states in Liberation in Our Hands that if we cannot correctly "recognize the nature of the false mode of existence that is being denied, we will not be able to realize the simple negation [Skr. prasajyapratisedhah or non-affirming negation] that is established through its refutation." For the Prāsaṅgika, when analyzing a table, the object being negated is not an abstract intellectual concept apart from the table which can be called 'inherent existing', but the conventionally appearing table itself, which appears to naive perception as being inherent. The table is not just empty of inherent existence in some abstract philosophical way; the identity of the table as it appears to normal, everyday perception - which misattributes inherence to the object - is being negated. Lama Tsongkhapa explains:We can say "therefore, [that] what exists objectively in terms of its own essence without being posited through the power of a subjective mind is called [...] 'intrinsic nature'" or ignorance Therefore, the object to be negated by reason is a conception that phenomena have an "ontological status—a way of existing—in and of themselves, without being posited through the force of an awareness.  Pabongka Rinpoche adds that "while simply knowing and using verbal explanations such as these may be enough to silence an opponent in debate we have not truly recognized the object to be refuted until we have recognized it within our own experience." In furtherance of this:This is the meaning of both ignorance and the object to be negated by valid cognition, according to the Madhyamaka-Prāsaṅgika in the view of Lama Tsongkhapa.

Indo-Tibetan rope & snake analogy
Under low light, the thought might arise that a striped rope on the ground is a snake, "but there is nothing on top of or inside this rope [...] to which we could" validly apply the term and therefore establish a conventionally existing snake. The Dalai Lama expands: In reality, the self of persons, objects, and abstracts is like the term-concept "snake" being designated upon a rope, "the snake is merely what can be designated by a mental label." Like this, the object of negation or ignorance is viewed to be the thought and perception which grasps the self of persons and objects to be established within their respective bases of designation. To put this in somewhat simpler terms, the thought and perception which grasps persons, things, and abstract phenomena as existing in-and-of themselves - with characteristics or an identity of their own - is seen to be ignorance in this system.

Incorrect Object of Negation (Permanence)
In the Gelugpa four tenets system, the object of negation is different for the Madhyamika-Prāsaṅgika than it is for Hinayana schools of Vaibhāṣika and Sautrāntika.{{refn|Daniel Cozart explaining this idea in greater detail:"A second category of tenets is concerned with implications of the Mahayana and Hinayana path structures. For the most part, they are tenets propounded to demonstrate that some persons who are regarded by other schools as Arhats liberated beings-are only ersatz Arhats, having realized only a coarse selflessness and having thereby suppressed, but not removed from the root, the obstructions to liberation. These tenets, then, revolve around the unique Prasangika assertion that the root of cyclic existence is the conception of inherent existence, which is more subtle than the conception of a self described by other systems of tenets. Five assertions are elucidated in this regard: 
 One must realize emptiness in order to become liberated and therefore some "Arhats" who have only realized a coarse selflessness are not actually liberated.
 There is desire that either is, or is thoroughly mixed with, the conception of true existence, and so-called Arhats still have this sort of desire.
 Although some of these "Arhats" do indeed have yogic direct perception of the four noble truths, one does not have to be an Arhat or even a Superior (one who has directly realized emptiness) in order to have such yogic direct perception.
 Although some of these "Arhats" have indeed realized the coarse aspects of the four noble truths, such a realization is not sufficient to overcome the obstructions to liberation.
 Since true cessations, the irrevocable cessation of some portion of the afflictions of desire, hatred, etc., are also emptinesses, such "Arhats" who have not realized emptiness could not have experienced true cessations, i.e., could not have overcome the afflictive obstructions."<ref>Cozart, Daniel Unique Tenets of the Middle Way Consequence School Pg 235</ref>|group=note}} Indeed, from the Prāsaṅgika viewpoint, Buddhist and non-Buddhist essentialist schools are not negating the correct object. According to Geshe Tenzin Zopa in Buddhist Tenets, the various Hinayana schools are negating a number of different objects, but none of them are inherent existence. Geshe Tenzin Zopa states: "From Vaibhāṣika school, they [the Vasiputriyans] assert selflessness/emptiness of the person/self is that which is impermanent (can momentarily change), has parts (physical parts, moments of time, various cardinal directions) and is dependent." Chandrakirti explains why the Prasangika do not see this as the final correct position: Lama Tsongkhapa supports the analysis of Chandrakirti when he says: 

Refuting that rational analysis is not required
From the point of view of the opponents of Prasangika, it is absurd "to conduct the extensive rational analysis required for refutations and proofs [which] is to meander among mere conventional words." They propose that "all phenomena are devoid of refutation and proof, in that, if something exists, it cannot be refuted, and, if it does not exist, it need not be refuted." An idea which Lama Tsongkhapa refers to as "a nonsensical collection of contradictions, showing neither general awareness of how reason establishes and negates things nor general awareness of how the path establishes and negates things."

Nagarjuna's Refutation of Objections he deals with this idea in a similar way:

What use is it to establish the negation
Of what does not exist anyway, even without words?
To answer that, the words "does not exist"
Cause understanding; they do not eliminate.

In his Commentary on Refutation of Objections Nagarjuna expands as follows:

The words, "All things lack intrinsic nature," do not cause things to 
lack intrinsic nature, but, in the absence of intrinsic nature, they do make it
understood that things lack intrinsic nature."

This can be illustrated with the following paraphrased example found in the same text. If a person named Devadatta is not in the house, but someone says, "Devadatta is in the house." Then in order
to show that Devadatta is not there, someone else will say, "Devadatta is not there." Those words do not cause Devadatta not to be there but allow the first person to understand that Devadatta is not in the house. Similarly, the words, "Things lack intrinsic nature," do not cause things to lack intrinsic nature, but help the those confused by ignorance to gain a valid cognition of reality.

Dependent Origination - Conventional Truth
At the time of Candrakīrti, the Prāsaṅgika discerned three levels of dependent origination:
 Pratītyasamutpāda or 'dependent arising.' All things arise in dependence on causes and conditions and cease when those causes and conditions are no longer present.
 All wholes are dependent upon their parts for existence, and all parts are dependent on their wholes for existence. From the Prāsaṅgika perspective, in order for something to exist, it must be designated validly by a designating consciousness. It is mind that determines that a cause has ceased and its effect is now in existence. To exemplify this, Lama Tsongkhapa quotes Buddhapalita's response to an Abhidharmica's objection: 

According to Lama Tsongkhapa by way of Buddhapalita, this was one of the points of Nagajuna's Chatuṣkoṭi. From Nagarjuna's Middle Way: "1. Not from itself, not from another, not from both, nor without cause: Never in any way is there any existing thing that has arisen." According to Mark Siderits and Shōryū Katsura, "This is the overall conclusion for which Nāgārjuna will argue in this chapter: that existents do not come into existence as the result of causes and conditions." Both modern scholars like Mark Siderits and Shōryū Katsura, and classical commentators Lama Tsongkhapa agree on this point. The implied modifying phrase in Nagarjuna's tetralema is "intrinsic" or "inherent" according to Tsongkhapa and ChandrakirtiTsongkhapa, Lamrim Chenmo, V3 p 216

So, the tetralemma would read: Not from intrinsic self, not from intrinsic other, not from intrinsic both, and not from intrinsic nothingness/causelessness. Notice that each one of these statements is a non-affirming negation which merely negates the subject and does not affirm some other mode of arising in its place. These four possibilities include all possible ways that a conventional phenomenon could arise if, in fact, they arose through some type of intrinsic arising process.  Each one of these modes is negated in sequence - self, other, both, no cause - to arrive at a mere absence: the absence of inherent modes of causality. These arguments are elucidated in great detail Lama Tsongkhapa's commentary on the Mūlamadhyamakakārikā Ocean of Reasoning.

 Parts-Whole are merely designated 
Further, one can look to the Seven-Point Analysis of a Chariot by Chandrakirti and find a similar treatment of parts-whole: 

It is mind which determines that some collection of parts is now considered to be a whole.Rigpawiki, Sevenfold Reasoning of the Chariot Therefore, the relationship of dependent designation is the most pervasive among the three types of dependencies, according to Prāsaṅgika. Therefore, Prāsaṅgika are not stating that nothing exists, but instead hold that phenomena only come into existence co-dependently with minds which are applying conceptual and nominal conventions to mere experiences.

 Dependent Designation is merely designated 
Things and phenomenon do exist co-dependently, based upon a relationship with a knowing and designating mind, but nothing exists in an independent, self-arising, or self-sustaining manner. The relationship between object and subject is also empty of inherent existence. From the 1st Panchen Lama's Lozang Chokyi Gyeltsen The Main Road of the Triumphant Ones:  To simplify the above, in the direct cognition of rigpa or clear light, there is no findable, inherent subject or object. When you arise from that meditation, things exist and function, but only as dependent designations. Thus they appear in reality - like a mirage or reflection appears in reality - but cannot be established as existing in-and-of themselves.

Emptiness - Ultimate Truth

Inseparability of Conventional & Ultimate Truth
According to the Prasangika, dependent-arising and emptiness are inseparable, and exist in a relationship of entity or identity. A relationship of entity or identity is one in which two objects are merely conceptually distinct, but not actually distinct. For example, the relationship between the mental categorization of a dog and that of an animal, with regards to the same being. If it is a dog, then it must also be an animal. Additionally, this relationship applies to impermanent phenomenon and products: if it's impermanent, it must be a product. Similarly, if it is a conventional arising then it is emptiness, and if it is emptiness, then it is a conventional arising. These two are merely conceptually distinct, but not actually distinct. The two truths are defined only in relationship with one another. In the Heart Sutra, Shariputra and Siddhārtha Gautama illucidate the idea of the emptiness-conventionality inseparability:  All phenomena are of the nature of emptiness and emptiness is nowhere to be found except as the nature of all phenomena. Emptiness is established as being synonymous with dependent arising. Dependent arising, also, is established as being synonymous with emptiness. The mere appearance of phenomena due to dependent designation is inseparable from the non-obstruction to their arising, which is emptiness.

Emptiness of Emptiness
According to both Tsongkhapa and Nagarjuna, emptiness is also empty of inherent existence: emptiness only exists nominally and conventionally. Emptiness is co-dependently arisen as a quality of conventional phenomena and is itself a conventional phenomenon. There is no emptiness just "floating around out there" or a "Great Emptiness from which everything else arises." For example, a table is empty of inherently being a table from its own side. This is referred to as "the emptiness of the table." The emptiness of the table exists conventionally as a property of that particular table. Lama Tsongkhapa quoting Chandrakirti: 

From the Prasaṅgika point of view, it is the same with all types of emptiness. There is no "independent emptiness" or "ultimate emptiness." Therefore, emptiness is an ultimate truth (a fact which applies to all possible phenomena, in all possible worlds), but it is not an ultimate phenomenon or ultimate reality (something which has always existed, is self-created, and is self-sustaining). It is also not a "Tao" or a primal substance from which all other things arise. Buddhapalita comically equates someone who thinks emptiness is inherent with someone who doesn't understand what "nothing" means: 

Nagarjuna paraphrases the Buddha in the Mulamadhyamikakarika, stating that "the Conqueror said that emptiness eradicates all dogmatic views; as for those who take a dogmatic view of emptiness, he said that they are incurable. Therefore, it is clear that the Prasangika do not advocate an inherent form of emptiness.

Karma is carried on the mere 'I'
The Prasangika refute the idea of a storehouse consciousness or mind-basis-of-all consciousness. According to Daniel Cozart's interpretation of Ngawang Belden, "the Buddha taught the mind-basis-of-all provisionally, for the benefit of those who could be helped by believing in its existence but who would be harmed by hearing the teachings about emptiness. In his own mind, the basis of his teaching was emptiness. [...] This is because the purpose of positing a mind-basis-of-all is supposed to be to provide a basis for experience without positing external objects." According to the Gelugpa, the Chittamatra hold that the mind-basis-of-all consciousness is that which bears the karmic seeds and is findable upon analysis. That is, "if one sought the basis of the designation of the person one would discover the mind-basis-of-all."

So, how is it that Madhyamika-Prasangika posit that beings accumulate karma and experience their effects without the mind-basis-of-all? They posit that karma is carried on the mere "I" which is dependently designated on the basis of the aggregates, stating that "it is a sufficient basis with which to associate the factors of disintegratedness (karma)." Daniel Cozant expands by saying that since phenomena are neither inherently created nor inherently destroyed according to Prasangika, that "therefore, the possibility of a later effect is not precluded."

Eight unique tenets & thirteen distinguishing features
According to Daniel Cozart's Unique Tenets of the Middle Way Consequence School (based on the work of Jamyang Shayba and Ngawang Belden) there are eight unique tenets within the Madhyamika-Prasangika viewpoint:

 The Unique Way of Refuting a Mind-Basis-of-All
 The Unique Way of Refuting Self-Consciousness
 The Non-Assertion of Autonomous Reasons (svatantra'')
 The Unique Way of Asserting External Objects
 The Proof That Hearers and Solitary Realizers Realize the Selflessness of Phenomena
 The Unique Way of Positing the Conception of a Self of Phenomena as an Affliction
 The Unique Way of Asserting That Disintegratedness Is a Functioning Thing
 The Unique Presentation of the Three Times

He also cites thirteen distinguishing features of the Prasangika view:

 Valid Cognition Is Mistaken but Reliable
 Refutation of Autonomous Syllogisms
 Prasangika Perspective on the Destruction of the Obstructions to Omniscience
 Pramana Is Not Necessarily New Cognition
 Mental Direct Perception Can be Conceptual
 Prasangika Perspectives on Nirvana
 The Two Selflessnesses of Persons and Phenomena Are Equally Subtle
 Desire and Aversion Conceive True Existence
 Common Beings Can Have Yogic Direct Perception
 One Can Directly Realize the Sixteen Aspects of the Four Noble Truths Even before the Path of Preparation
 True Cessations Are the Dharmadhatu
 Pratyaksa Refers to Objects
 How Prasangikas Avoid the Two Extremes.

Criticism
Some of the greatest subsequent Tibetan scholars have become famous for their own works either defending or attacking Tsongkhapa's views.

Svātantrika in disguise
According to the Padmakara Translation Group: 

According to the Nyingma lineage, Ju Mipham was one of the critics who argued that Je Tsongkhapa was also a Svatantrika, because of the way he refutes true establishment instead of objects themselves. According to Ju Mipham, Je Tsongkhapa's approach is an excellent Svatantrika approach, that leads students in the right direction but will not lead to the true ultimate until they go further.

Own inventions 
Tsongkhapa's rejection of Svatantrika has been criticised within the Tibetan tradition, qualifying it as Tsongkhapa's own invention, "novelties that are not found in any Indian sources," and therefore "a major flaw" and "unwarranted and unprecedented within the greater Madhyamaka tradition."

According to Thupten Jinpa, the Gelugpa school sees Tsongkhapa's ideas as mystical revelations from the bodhisattva Manjusri, whereas Gorampa accused him of being inspired by a demon. Brunnhölzl further notes that, according to his Karma Kagyü (Mahamudra) critics, Tsongkhapa was mistaken in some regards in his understanding of emptiness, taking it as a real existent, and thereby hindering the liberation of his followers. According to Van Schaik, these criticisms furthered the establishment of the Gelupga as an independent school:

Hornlike object of negation 
Karl Brunnholzl notes that Tsongkhapa's "object of negation," the "phantom notion of 'real existence' different from the 'table that is established through valid cognition'," is called a "hornlike object of negation" by his critics: Tsongkhapa first puts a horn on the head of the rabbit, and then removes it again, a maneuver which "affects neither the rabbit's existence nor your taking the rabbit for a rabbit." According to Brunnholzl,

Levels of realization
As a result of Je Tsongkhapa's view, the Gelugpa lineage establishes a sort of ladder of progressively refined worldviews and identify the Svatantrika view as inferior to the Prasangika. Sakya and Kagyu scholars argued against the claim that students using Svatantrika do not achieve the same realization as those using the Prasangika approach; According to those critics, there is no difference in the realization of those using the Svatantrika and Prasangika approaches. They also argue that the Svatantrika approach is better for students who are not able to understand the more direct approach of Prasangika, but it nonetheless results in the same ultimate realization.

See also

Buddha-nature
Buddhapālita
Consciousness-only
Nagarjuna
Mūlamadhyamakakārikā
Schools of Buddhism
Madhyamaka
Prasangika
Sautrantika
Yogacara
Two Truths Doctrine

Notes

Subnotes

References
Printed

Web

Sources

Primary
 
 
 
 

Secondary

Further reading
Primary
 
 
Scholarly

External links
The Buddha Within by S. K. Hookham on Rangtong and Shentong

Madhyamaka
Mahayana
Buddhist philosophy
Tibetan Buddhism